CPZ may refer to:

CPZ (gene), a gene coding for the enzyme carboxypeptidase Z
 CPZ: an EEG electrode site according to the 10-20 system
Circuit Park Zandvoort, a motorsport track near Zandvoort, the Netherlands
Continuous permafrost zone, an area where permafrost cannot thaw
Controlled parking zone, a type of UK parking restriction
Chlorpromazine, an antipsychotic drug
Compass Airlines (North America) (ICAO designator), a U.S. airline 
Corner Patrol Zone, a type of hazard in the Robot Wars Arena

 Zoos
 Capron Park Zoo, Attleboro, Massachusetts
 Central Park Zoo, Manhattan, New York City
 Charles Paddock Zoo, San Luis Obispo County, California